Ramganj Senuwari   is a village development committee in Sunsari District in the Kosi Zone of south-eastern Nepal. At the time of the 1991 Nepal census it had a population of 8251.

References

Populated places in Sunsari District